Virginia Gray may refer to:

 Virginia Gray (political scientist), American political scientist
 Virginia Gray Henry Blakemore, American writer and filmmaker
 Virginia Gray, the mayor of Wendell, North Carolina
 Virginia Gray, a character from the television series Heroes
See also:
Virginia Grey, American actress